Henry Banks (June 14, 1913 – December 18, 1994) was an American midget car and "big car" driver.
"Married Roseanne Eisamann,  two children, John Allen Banks, and Kathryn Roseanne Banks, three grandchildren Allen Edwin Banks, Jeffrey Henry Banks and Gavin Working "

Background
Henry Banks was born in England, but brought up in Royal Oak, Michigan. He was the son of an early European race-driver. Henry began competing in 1932, when he was 19 years old, and became successful in the midget cars.

Racing career
He was the first driver to pass the qualifying "rookie test" at the Indianapolis 500 in 1936. He also drove as a relief driver in 1937, 1939, and 1940, with a 21st-place finish in 1938.

He won the 1941 American Racing Drivers Club (ARDC) championship in New England.

After a break during the war, when he worked at Ford’s aero-engine division, Banks’ career took off. In 1947 he won 30 midget car races. In 1950, he was the AAA National Champion and, in the same year, came second in the National Midget points.

Banks later retired from racing and became USAC Director of Competitions, and was also inducted in the National Midget Auto Racing Hall of Fame. He died at Indianapolis in 1994.

Actor
Also at this time, Banks appeared in two films. The first was To Please A Lady, starring Clark Gable. The second was Roar of the Crowd, starring Howard Duff.

Racing record

Indianapolis 500 results

Complete AAA Championship Car results

Complete Formula One World Championship results
(key)

References
 

1913 births
1994 deaths
Champ Car champions
Indianapolis 500 drivers
Racing drivers from Detroit